Sainte-Marie-du-Mont is a commune in the Manche department and in the region of Normandy in north-western France. The commune has 712 inhabitants (2019).

Geography 
Saint-Marie-du-Mont is located in the southeast of the Cotentin Peninsula, just north of the town of Carentan, and west of the :fr:Baie des Veys , the outlet of the Douve and the Vire.

The commune has a vast area in relation to neighbouring communes, it is bordered to the east by the English Channel, on the north by Audouville-la-Hubert, northwest by Turqueville, west by Bouteville, by Hiesville to the southwest and to the south by Brucheville and Brévands.

Climate 
Sainte-Marie-du-Mont has a oceanic climate (Köppen climate classification Cfb).

History

World War II 

It is best known for being the scene of a military engagement between the American 101st Airborne Division and the German Wehrmacht on D-Day, June 6, 1944.

The village of Sainte-Marie-du-Mont was occupied by sixty German soldiers of the 191 Artillery-Regiment (91. Infanterie Division).  The Germans used the church tower as an observation post and on a clear day, they could see all the way to the sea. Far away from an expected invasion near Calais, they did not know the village was at the southern edge of D-Day's ‘drop zone c’. After a heavy coastal bombardment by Allies just after midnight on 6 June 1944, the first American Paratroopers were dropped in dark early hours over occupied Normandy.

Plans were for troops of the 506th Parachute Infantry Regiment and the 3rd Battalion of the 501st Parachute Infantry Regiment of the 101st Airborne Division to land in ‘zone c’.  Here behind Utah beach, they were responsible for clearing a route for thousands of soldiers arriving by sea from England. A thick fog bank and heavy flak from coastal guns forced pilots away from their targets and left paratroopers in unknown territory, some facing enemy fire while still in the air. Just two-thirds of troops designated for zone c were accurately dropped.  A number found themselves landing in and around Sainte-Marie-du-Mont and quickly fighting for their lives with the rather surprised Germans.

In the hamlet of La Madeleine, a monument in honour of the Danish sailors was erected. 800 of them took part in the logistics of landing on allied ships.

Heraldry

Politics and administration

Demographics

Economy and tourism 

Places and monuments 

: A museum which traces the military exploit of the Normandy landings and more specifically that of Utah Beach. Created in 1962, it is located adjacent to the beach, even where American troops landed on the morning of June 6. The museum presents a substantial collection of archival photographs, models, maps, and particular articles of veterans and distributes an archive film in three languages.
Former Museum of the Occupation (Now Permanently Closed): located in the former German military headquarters for the Utah Beach sector, it housed the  before becoming the headquarters of American troops. This building is surprising, particularly by its murals created by the Germans themselves. The building became the headquarters of US 4th Infantry Division (United States) and various other units for the Utah Beach area on the morning of 6 June 1944 and until 1 November. This property is now listed as a Monument Historique with the Government of France, and is privately owned.
Liberation Museum: Located opposite the church, this museum houses a collection of uniforms, weapons, equipment and American and German vehicles. Captured trophies and objects from excavations of the battlefield where the paratroopers of the 101st Airborne Division and the American beach landing units faced the German troops.
, built in the 11th century and revised in the 12th to 13th centuries, is a listed monument since 1840. Before the Revolution, one could see the white marble tomb of Henri-Robert-aux-Épaules above which stood a group representing the captain kneeling in full armor and accompanied by two Swiss.
Utah Beach
Borne No. 0 0 of the "Liberty Road" at Utah Beach.
Stele in tribute to the sailors of the US Navy.
Redoute d'Audouville (17th century)
Château de l'Islet, one of the oldest of the Cotentin. The first building, probably a simple wooden fort was replaced by a castle, which included moats, dungeons, and drawbridges. It was demolished by Robert-aux-Épaules in the early seventeenth century and replaced by a castle with two identical dwellings bordering the two opposite sides of a courtyard surrounded by moats. The latter was abandoned in the eighteenth century and was later partially destroyed, especially during the Revolution. Few vestiges remain.
Grandies Farm, seemed to belong to the 17th century Brohier, lord of the Grandis. The home is an elongated rectangular building, built in limestone rubble and covered by a hipped slate roof.
Maillardière Manor Farm (17th century)
Lavalle Nanor Farm
The manor in Sainte-Marie-du-Mont: The land was part of the manor of Charles, Prince of Soubise, sold in 1821. In the late 19th century, the Gosselin family simultaneously owned the manor, the river and Brucheville Manor.
Haudienville Manor (16th century), now separated by a boundary wall which divides the house into two properties. This remarkable mansion had a chapel founded in 1660. Its home is a vast construct comprising a rectangular building flanked by a pavilion.
Blainville Manor
Brécourt Manor (12th and 18th centuries), its name has evolved from Brucourt en Brécourt. The overall construction is rubble limestone. The roofs are slate, the house is on two levels lit by windows divided into bays. It was the scene of one of the most significant feats of the Battle of Normandy, the Brécourt Manor Assault, led by paratroopers of the 506th Infantry Regiment led by Lt. Richard Winters of the 101st Airborne Division, on 6 June 1944.
Franqueville Manor
La Rivière Manor (16th century), the house is built of rubble limestone and discovered covered by a gabled slate roof. It is a long building with a tower of polygonal staircase off-work. Its agricultural buildings are dated from 1793.
Vienville Manor, its name has evolved from Viéville (after 1656), then Vieuville. Between 1656 and 1699, Jean Mouton, husband of Miss Françoise Hauchemail, heir of the manor, undertook major renovations. From the old mansion some remains of the 17th century still hold attention, including a long farm building housing a remarkable carriage house and stable.
Mardelle Manor

Notable people 
Paul-Jacques Bonzon, born in Sainte-Marie-du-Mont in 1908, a teacher trained at the école normale in Saint-Lô, worked most of his career in the department of Drôme. He was among the most representative youth novelist of the 1960s to the 1980s. Author of more than a hundred novels, he is best known for the hit series  [The Six Companions], La Famille HLM [The HLM Family] and Diabolo le petit chat [Diablo the Little Cat]. He did not forget his hometown. The action of some of his novels is situated in the area: The dunes of Sainte-Marie-du-Mont, the beaches of Ravenoville, the Îles Saint-Marcouf, etc. He died in Valence in 1978.
Gilles Perrault has lived in Sainte-Marie-du-Mont for more than thirty years. He wrote Les Gens d'ici [The People Here], a book that describes the life of the local residents.

International relations 
Sainte-Marie-du-Mont is twinned with Edelfingen, Bad Mergentheim.

See also 
Communes of the Manche department

References

External links 

Official website of Sainte-Marie-du-Mont
 Information about skirmishes in and around Sainte-Marie-du-Mont on D-Day, with images

Saintemariedumont
Populated coastal places in France